The Nevin Yanıt Athletics Complex also known as Nevin Yanıt Athletics Facility is a sports venue for athletics competitions in track and field located in Mersin, Turkey.

Description
The stadium, situated at Kocavilayet neighborhood of Mersin, was built in 2010, and renamed in February 2011 in honor of the European champion hurdler Nevin Yanıt (born 1986), a native of Mersin. It has a seating capacity of 4,500.

The complex hosted the athletics and paralympic athletics events of the 2013 Mediterranean Games.

See also
Nevin Yanıt
2013 Mediterranean Games

References

Sports venues in Mersin
Athletics (track and field) venues in Turkey
Sports venues completed in 2010
2013 Mediterranean Games venues
Yenişehir, Mersin